Triangle is a Bengali thriller-drama film directed by Anindya Sarkar. This film was released on 29 November 2019 under the banner of Baba Bhoothnath Entertainment.
The film stars Kaushik Sen and Satabdi Chakraborty.

Plot
The film revolves around a love triangle which changes the life of Rajdip Sen, a renowned corporate magnet and widower. He lives a lonely and simple life with the memories of his deceased wife Manju. Suddenly he becomes romantically involved with Tanaya Chatterjee, a beautiful TV anchor. Although Tanaya is the host of a health awareness show she is an alcoholic and addicted to a reckless life. Rajdip convinces and helps her back to a normal life and marries her. After a few days a stranger sends a series of letters to Rajdip which exposes some shocking truths about Tanaya. He finds out that Tanaya is having an extramarital affair.

Cast
 Koushik Sen as Rajdip
 Biswanath Basu
 Pallavi Chatterjee
 Reshmi Bhattacharya as Tanaya
 Raj Bhattacharya
 Satabdi Chakraborty
 Ananya Sengupta

References

Bengali-language Indian films
2010s Bengali-language films
2019 films
2019 thriller drama films
Indian thriller drama films